The Ljubljana Silverhawks are an American football team based in Ljubljana, Slovenia, founded in 2002 by a group of football fans from the Slovenian capital. It is the first team to have brought the sport in Slovenia. The team has achieved the first place in six editions of the Slovenian Football League (2009–10, 2011, 2012, 2013, 2016, and 2017). The team has also won a title in the Central European Football League in 2012.

Before the 2019 season, Ljubljana Silverhawks merged with Domžale Tigers.

History
The Ljubljana Silverhawks were established in April 2002, becoming the first American football team based in Slovenia. The Silverhawks were not affiliated in any American Football leagues.

In 2006, the Silverhawks were one of the founding members of the Central European Football League. In the CEFL, the Silverhawks had been in turbulence times.

In 2009, together with three other teams, the Silverhawks have competed in the first-ever Slovenian Football League. On June 26, 2010, the Silverhawks met the Alp Devils. The Silverhawks won 41–0, becoming the first champions of Slovenia.

The Silverhawks retained the Slovenian Football League title in 2011, after defeating the Croatian team Zagreb Thunder, which competed as the guest team. The Silverhawks won the CEFL title, and then, they won another Slovenian League titles in 2012 and 2013, respectively.

In 2016, the Silverhawks joined the Austrian Football League and reached the wild-card-playoffs three times in a row. After the 2018 season, the Silverhawks left the AFL due to financial problems.

Honours
 Slovenian Football League
 Champions (6): 2009–10, 2011, 2012, 2013, 2016, 2017
 Central European Football League
 Champions (1): 2012
 Runners-up (2): 2010, 2014

Season statistics

Slovenian Bowl appearances

CEFL Bowl appearances

Austrian Football League

 WC = Wild card
 SF = Semi-final

References 

American football teams in Slovenia
Sports clubs in Ljubljana
2002 establishments in Slovenia
American football teams established in 2002